Glandora oleifolia, the olive-leaved gromwell (syn. Lithodora oleifolia, Lithospermum oleifolium), is a species of flowering plant in the family Boraginaceae. The plant is native to a small rocky area near Figueras in the eastern Pyrenees, and is endemic to Spain.

Description
It has silky dark green leaves, similar to olive (Olea europea) leaves in shape. The plant produces sky-blue 5-lobed flowers.

Cultivation
Glandora oleifolia is cultivated as an ornamental plant. In gardens it prefers an alkaline soil. It has gained the Royal Horticultural Society's Award of Garden Merit

Taxonomy
Its former name in Latin, lithodora, literally means "stone gift", referring to its preference for rocky places. The term oleifolia means "olive leaved", though it is not closely related to the true olives.

References

External links

Endemic flora of Spain
Endemic flora of the Iberian Peninsula
Flora of the Pyrenees
Garden plants of Europe